Lovellona is a genus of sea snails, marine gastropod mollusks in the family Mitromorphidae.

Description 
Lovellona reproduce sexually. "Dead Lovellona form shallow marine sediments".

Species
According to the World Register of Marine Species (WoRMS), the following species with a valid name are included within the genus Lovellona:
 Lovellona atramentosa (Reeve, 1849)
 Lovellona biconus Chino & Stahlschmidt, 2009
 Lovellona carbonaria Chino & Stahlschmidt, 2009
 Lovellona elongata Chino & Stahlschmidt, 2009
 Lovellona grandis Chino & Stahlschmidt, 2009
 Lovellona peaseana Finlay, 1927

References

 Iredale, Tom. "More molluscan name-changes, generic and specific." Journal of Molluscan Studies 12.6 (1917): 322-330
  Chino, M. & Stahlschmidt, P., 2009. - New turrid species of the Mitromorpha-complex (Gastropoda: Clathurellinae) from the Philippines and Japan. Visaya: 63-82

External links
 Bouchet, P.; Kantor, Y. I.; Sysoev, A.; Puillandre, N. (2011). A new operational classification of the Conoidea (Gastropoda). Journal of Molluscan Studies. 77(3): 273-308
 
 Worldwide Mollusc Species Data Base: Mitromorphidae

 
Gastropod genera